Roy Fowler (22 March 1920 – 19 September 2002) was an Australian Paralympic competitor, who won ten medals at six Paralympics from 1964 to 1988.

Personal
Fowler was born in Brisbane. He played rugby league and competed in swimming for his school until he was twelve, when he went to the outback to work at a drover's camp during the Great Depression. At the age of fourteen, he had his first professional fight. During World War II, he was a gunner in the 2/2 Tank Attack Regiment of the Australian Army, and after the war, he toured Australia as part of a tag team professional wrestling circuit.

In 1963 he had a cerebral haemorrhage after a coalmining accident, and became a quadriplegic. He spent six months in the spinal unit of the Princess Alexandra Hospital and then went to the Kingshome Rehabilitation Centre, where he was introduced to wheelchair sport. He died on 19 September 2002 at the age of 82. He was survived by his wife, Mary, and at the time of his death he was living in East Ipswich. He was nicknamed "Chook".

Fowler was also an accomplished artist, painting during his spare time. He was also well known in Brisbane's horse racing community, becoming a part-owner of racehorses during his regular Saturday visits to racetracks when his sporting commitments allowed.

Competitive career
Fowler's first international competition was the 1964 Tokyo Games, where he won three gold medals in swimming in the Men's 25 m Breaststroke complete class 1, Men's 25 m Freestyle Prone complete class 1, and Men's 25 m Freestyle Supine complete class 1 events, and two silver medals in archery in the Men's St. Nicholas Round open and Men's St. Nicholas Round Team open events. In archery, he also won a silver medal in the Men's FITA Round open event and a bronze medal in the Men's FITA Round Team open event at the 1972 Heidelberg Games, and participated but did not win any medals in both archery and dartchery at the 1968 Tel Aviv and 1976 Toronto games. His favourite sport was archery, and he reached the top 20 in the world in non-disabled archery competition.
In 1981 he took up lawn bowls, and reached the semi-finals in the sport at the 1983 Stoke Mandeville Games. He won two gold medals in the sport at the 1984 New York/Stoke Mandeville Games in both the Men's Pairs and Singles paraplegic  events, the former event with Eric Magennis, and another gold medal at the 1988 Seoul Games in the Men's Pairs 2–6 event with Stan Kosmala. The first Paralympic gold medallist in lawn bowls from Queensland, he was undefeated in national disabled competitions from 1982 to 1991, winning nine national singles titles,  and excelled in non-disabled lawn bowls competitions. After a health setback in 1998 that saw him in hospital for a year, he won a gold medal in a national competition months after his release. He won 100 medals in national and international wheelchair sport.

Recognition
In 2000 at the age of 80, Fowler participated in the Paralympic torch relay. That year, he received an Australian Sports Medal.

References

External links
 

Paralympic archers of Australia
Paralympic dartchers of Australia
Paralympic lawn bowls players of Australia
Australian male archers
Australian male bowls players
Male Paralympic swimmers of Australia
Archers at the 1964 Summer Paralympics
Archers at the 1968 Summer Paralympics
Archers at the 1972 Summer Paralympics
Archers at the 1976 Summer Paralympics
Dartchers at the 1968 Summer Paralympics
Dartchers at the 1976 Summer Paralympics
Lawn bowls players at the 1984 Summer Paralympics
Lawn bowls players at the 1988 Summer Paralympics
Swimmers at the 1964 Summer Paralympics
Medalists at the 1964 Summer Paralympics
Medalists at the 1972 Summer Paralympics
Medalists at the 1984 Summer Paralympics
Medalists at the 1988 Summer Paralympics
Paralympic gold medalists for Australia
Paralympic silver medalists for Australia
Paralympic bronze medalists for Australia
Paralympic medalists in archery
Paralympic medalists in lawn bowls
Paralympic medalists in swimming
Wheelchair category Paralympic competitors
Australian male freestyle swimmers
People with tetraplegia
Recipients of the Australian Sports Medal
Sportspeople from Brisbane
Sportspeople from Ipswich, Queensland
Australian Army soldiers
Australian Army personnel of World War II
Australian stockmen
1920 births
2002 deaths